The 5th Army was an army level command of the German Army in World War I.  It was formed on mobilization in August 1914 seemingly from the VII Army Inspection. The army was disbanded in 1919 during demobilization after the war.

History 
In August 1914 the command of 5th Army was assigned to Crown Prince Wilhelm of Germany, heir to the Hohenzollern throne, with General Schmidt von Knobelsdorf serving as his chief of staff, and would remain thus until late 1916.  The opening hostilities on the Western Front saw the Crown Prince's 5th Army, along with the neighboring 4th Army (commanded by Albrecht, Duke of Württemberg), acting at the center of the Schlieffen plan attack into Belgium and France.  On 21 August 1914, in what became known as the Battle of the Ardennes, 4th and 5th Armies advanced into the Ardennes to counter a thrust by the French 3rd and 4th Armies.  Over the next two days 5th Army played a major part in halting the opposing French forces.  By 23 August, after taking heavy losses and being outmaneuvered strategically, the two French armies were driven into retreat.  Following the German 5th Army's victory in the Battle of the Ardennes it moved to Verdun, where it would remain until 1918.  In February 1916 the Crown Prince's 5th Army would launch Operation Gericht, the German offensive that began the Battle of Verdun, one of the bloodiest and longest battles in history.  Late in 1916, after suffering terrible losses in its efforts at Verdun, General Max von Gallwitz assumed control of 5th Army.  Before the close of the war 5th Army fought in several noteworthy actions, including the Battle of Saint-Mihiel, in September 1918, when it was defeated by the American Expeditionary Force under John J. Pershing. The Fifth Army continued to oppose the AEF's Meuse-Argonne Offensive until the Armistice of 11 November 1918.  At the end of the war it was serving as part of Heeresgruppe Gallwitz.

Order of Battle, 30 October 1918 
By the end of the war, the 5th Army was organised as:

Commanders 
The 5th Army had the following commanders during its existence:

Glossary 
Armee-Abteilung or Army Detachment in the sense of "something detached from an Army".  It is not under the command of an Army so is in itself a small Army.
Armee-Gruppe or Army Group in the sense of a group within an Army and under its command, generally formed as a temporary measure for a specific task.
Heeresgruppe or Army Group in the sense of a number of armies under a single commander.

See also 

5th Army (Wehrmacht) for the equivalent formation in World War II
German Army order of battle (1914)
German Army order of battle, Western Front (1918)
Schlieffen Plan

References

Bibliography 
 
 

05
Military units and formations established in 1914
Military units and formations disestablished in 1919